The 2018–19 Bulgarian Basketball Cup is the 65th edition of the annual cup tournament in Bulgaria.It is managed by the Bulgarian Basketball Federation.The competition will start on December 27, 2018, with the quarterfinals and will end with the Final on March 2, 2019 in Panagyurishte.

Format
This season, only clubs from National Basketball League (Bulgaria) will participate, except Cherno More, which withdrew from the competition. The quarterfinals and semifinals are played in a double-legged format, while the Final is played in single game on a neutral venue.

Participating clubs

Bracket

Source: Basketball.bg

Quarterfinals

Semifinals

Final

References

Bulgarian Basketball Cup
Cup